Martin Mountain Ridge is a ridge located in Allegany County, Maryland lying 3.25 miles west of Flintstone, Maryland and extending into Pennsylvania.  Its highest elevation is 1,980 feet.

(N. 39°42' W. 78°38')

References 
 United States Geological Survey
 Maryland Geological survey

Landforms of Allegany County, Maryland
Ridges of Maryland
Ridges of Pennsylvania
Ridges of Bedford County, Pennsylvania